The Saudi Arabian Society for Culture and Arts (SASCA) is a civil society institution established in 1973. It is headquartered in Riyadh, Saudi Arabia and has 16 branches throughout the country. It was the first civil institution in Saudi Arabia to sponsor cultural and artistic activities. Its current chair is Omar Saif.

Vision 2030 and SASCA 
As part of the current endeavor to promote cultural works in Saudi Arabia, in the framework of Saudi Vision 2030, SASCA has established an art training institute, Thaqqif, to train young talents and provide them with creative tools. It has courses in fine arts, photography, calligraphy, digital arts and design, art writing, music, theater and folklore arts, filmmaking, and cinema.

References 

Cultural organizations based in Asia
1973 establishments in Saudi Arabia